The fourth season of My Hero Academia anime television series was produced by Bones and directed by Kenji Nagasaki (chief director) and Masahiro Mukai, following the story of the original manga series from the second half of the 14th volume to the first chapters of the 21st volume. It covers the "Shie Hassaikai" (chapters 125–162), "Remedial Course" (chapters 163–168), "U.A. School Festival" (chapters 169–183), and the first part of the "Pro Hero" arc (chapters 184–190); partially including chapters 191–193. The season ran from October 12, 2019 to April 4, 2020, on ytv and NTV.

The season follows Izuku Midoriya and his classmates in their Hero Work-Studies, where they face off against the Shie Hassaikai group, with their mission is to stop them from creating a Quirk-Destroying Drug and save a little girl at the center of it. Meanwhile, two students of U.A. High attend a special Hero License Course, having failed their previous exam. Then, U.A. holds its annual School Festival and Class 1-A decides to have a dance performance with a live band in hopes to ease the public's doubt of their worth. Later, the new hero rankings was revealed after All Might's retirement.

Funimation has licensed the season for an English-language release in North America. Funimation premiered the first episode of the fourth season at Anime Expo on July 6, 2019, with the English dub. Crunchyroll and Hulu are simulcasting the season outside of Asia as it airs, while FunimationNow is streaming in Simuldub. Funimation's adaptation premiered on Adult Swim's Toonami programming block on November 9, 2019. Several episodes on Toonami got delayed, due to the schedule redaction or disruption and the effects of COVID-19 pandemic which ended on June 28, 2020, instead of May as it originally scheduled.

Four pieces of theme music are used for this season: two opening themes and two ending themes. Chrissy Costanza performs the insert songs "Each Goal" in episode 19 and "Hero too" in episode 23.



Episode list

Home video release

Japanese
Toho released the fourth season of the anime on DVD and Blu-ray in six volumes in Japan, with the first volume released on January 22, 2020, and the final volume released on August 19, 2020.

English
Funimation released the series in North America in two volumes, with the first volume released on September 29, 2020 and the second volume on February 16, 2021. Both volumes received a DVD/Blu-ray release on February 15, 2022.

Notes

References

My Hero Academia episode lists
2019 Japanese television seasons
2020 Japanese television seasons